Telugu cinema, also known as Tollywood, is the segment of Indian cinema dedicated to the production of motion pictures in the Telugu language, widely spoken in the states of Andhra Pradesh and Telangana. Telugu cinema is based in Film Nagar, Hyderabad. , Telugu cinema is the largest film industry in India in terms of box-office. Telugu films sold 23.3 crore (233 million) tickets in 2022, the highest among various film industries in India.

Technical crafts of Telugu cinema, especially visual effects and cinematography, are considered as one of the most advanced in Indian cinema. The industry has produced some of India's most expensive and highest-grossing films of all time. Telugu production Baahubali 2 (2017) is currently the highest-grossing film of all time in India.

Since 1909, filmmaker Raghupathi Venkaiah Naidu was involved in producing short films and exhibiting them in different regions of Asia. He established the first Indian-owned movie theatres in South India. In 1921, he produced the silent film, Bhishma Pratigna, generally considered to be the first Telugu feature film. As the first Telugu film exhibitor and producer, he is regarded as the 'Father of Telugu cinema'. The first Telugu film with audible dialogue, Bhakta Prahlada (1932) was directed by H. M. Reddy. In 1933, Sati Savitri directed by C. Pullayya received an honorary diploma at the 2nd Venice Film Festival. Since its inception, Telugu cinema was known as the pre-eminent centre of mythological films in India. From the late 1930s, films focused on contemporary living and social issues, like Raithu Bidda (1939), were produced and gradually gained prominence.

Ten Telugu films were featured in CNN-IBN list of "100 Greatest Indian Films of All Time". Though known for big-ticket, and popular films catering to wider audience, Telugu filmmakers also forayed into parallel and arthouse films. Parallel films like Daasi (1988), Thilaadanam (2000), Vanaja (2006) among others have won accolades at major film festivals including Berlin, Karlovy Vary, Moscow, and Busan. Since the mid-2010s, Telugu cinema has pioneered the pan-Indian film movement, cutting across ethnic and linguistic barriers. Baahubali 2 (2017) won the Saturn Award for Best International Film. RRR (2022) received various international accolades including an Academy Award and a Golden Globe Award for the song "Naatu Naatu", and the Critics' Choice Award for Best Foreign Language Film.

History

Early development 

Raghupathi Venkaiah Naidu was a photographer and photographic studio owner in Madras who was drawn into filmmaking. Since 1909, he was involved in producing short films. He shot 12 three-minute-long short films and exhibited them in Victoria Public Hall, Madras. He also travelled to Bangalore, Vijayawada, Sri Lanka, Rangoon and Pegu to exhibit his films. In , he established a tent house called Esplanade in Madras to exhibit his films. In , he established Gaiety Theatre on Mount Road, the first ever permanent cinema theatre in Madras and all of South India. He later constructed Crown Theatre on Mint Street and Globe Theatre in Purasawakkam. In his theatres, he screened American and European films as well as silent films made in various parts of India.

In 1919, he started a film production company called 'Star of East Films' also called 'Glass Studio', the first production company established by a Telugu person. He sent his son, Raghupati Surya Prakash Naidu (R. S. Prakash) to study filmmaking in the studios of England, Germany, and United States. In 1921, they made Bhishma Pratigna, generally considered as the first Telugu feature film. Venkaiah Naidu produced the film, while R. S. Prakash directed and produced it along with playing the title character Bhishma. As the first Telugu film exhibitor and producer, Raghupathi Venkaiah Naidu is regarded as the 'Father of Telugu cinema'.

From 1921 to 1931 about a dozen feature films were made by Telugu people. C. Pullayya made a three-reel short film, Markandeya (1926 or 1931) at his house in Kakinada. In 1921, the first movie theatre in Andhra, Maruthi Cinema was established in Vijayawada by Pothina Srinivasa Rao. Y. V. Rao and R. S. Prakash established a long-lasting precedence of focusing exclusively on religious themes Gajendra Moksham, Nandanar, and Matsyavataram  three of their most noted productions, centred on religious figures, parables, and morals.

Rise of the "talkie" 

The first Telugu film with audible dialogue, Bhakta Prahlada, was directed by H. M. Reddy, who directed the first bilingual (Tamil and Telugu) talkie Kalidas (1931). Bhakta Prahlada was shot over 18 or 20 days at Imperial Studios, Bombay and was produced by Ardeshir Irani who also produced Alam Ara, India's first sound film. The film had an all-Telugu starcast featuring Sindhoori Krishna Rao as the titular Prahlada, Munipalle Subbayya as Hiranyakasyapa, and Surabhi Kamalabai as Leelavathy. Bhakta Prahlada was completed on 15 September 1931, which henceforth became known as "Telugu Film Day" to commemorate its completion.

Popularly known as talkies, films with sound quickly grew in number and popularity. In 1932, Sagar Movietone produced Rama Paduka Pattabhishekam and Sakunthala, both directed by Sarvottam Badami. Neither the producer nor the director of these two films were Telugus. In 1933, Pruthviputra, based on the story of Narakasura was released. It starred Kalyanam Raghuramayya and was produced by Pothina Srinivasa Rao, who had previously built the first movie theatre in Andhra in 1921. This was the first Telugu talkie entirely financed by Telugu people.

In 1934, the industry saw its first major commercial success with Lava Kusa. Directed by C. Pullayya and starring Parupalli Subbarao and Sriranjani, the film attracted unprecedented numbers of viewers to theatres and thrust the young industry into mainstream culture. Dasari Kotiratnam produced Anasuya in 1935 and became the first female producer of Telugu film industry. The first film studio in Andhra, Durga Cinetone, was built in 1936 by Nidamarthi Surayya in Rajahmundry. Sampurna Ramayanam (1936) was the first film produced by the studio relying mostly on local talent. In 1937, another studio called Andhra Cinetone was built in Visakhapatnam. However, both the studios were short-lived.

By 1936, the mass appeal of film allowed directors to move away from religious and mythological themes. That year, under the direction of Kruthiventi Nageswara Rao, Prema Vijayam, a film with a contemporary setting, was released. It was the first Telugu film with a modern-day setting as opposed to mythological and folklore films. Later, more 'social films' i.e. films based on contemporary life and social issues, were made by filmmakers. Notable among them was Vandemataram (1939), touching on societal problems like the practice of dowry. Telugu films increasingly focused on contemporary living: 29 of the 96 films released between 1937 and 1947 had social themes.

Cinema during the Crown Rule 

In 1938, Gudavalli Ramabrahmam has co-produced and directed the social problem film, Mala Pilla starring Kanchanamala. The film dealt with the crusade against untouchability, prevailing in pre-independent India. In 1939, he directed Raithu Bidda, starring thespian Bellary Raghava. The film was banned by the British administration in the region, for depicting the uprise of the peasantry among the Zamindar's during the British raj. The success of these films gave an impetus to Y. V. Rao, B. N. Reddy and others to produce films on social themes. Viswa Mohini (1940) is the first Indian film depicting the Indian movie world. The film was directed by Y. V. Rao and scripted by Balijepalli Lakshmikantha Kavi, starring V. Nagayya. Rao subsequently made the sequel films Savithri and Sathyabhama (1941–42) casting thespian Sthanam Narasimha Rao.

The outbreak of World War II and the subsequent resource scarcity caused the British Raj to impose a limit on the use of filmstrip in 1943 to 11,000 feet, a sharp reduction from the 20,000 feet that had been common till then. As a result, the number of films produced during the war was substantially lower than in previous years. Nonetheless, before the ban, an important shift occurred in the industry: Independent studios formed, actors and actresses were signed to contracts limiting whom they could work for, and films moved from social themes to folklore legends. Ghantasala Balaramayya, has directed the mythological Sri Seeta Rama Jananam (1944) under his home production, Prathiba Picture, marking veteran Akkineni Nageswara Rao's debut in a lead role.

Classical cinema and Golden Age 
Malliswari is the first Telugu film which had a public release with thirteen prints along with Chinese subtitles at Beijing on 14 March 1953, and a 16 mm film print was also screened in the United States. The film was directed by B. N. Reddy, a recipient of the Dada Saheb Phalke Award, and the Doctor of Letters honour.

The industry is one of the largest producers of folklore, fantasy, and mythological films. Filmmakers like K. V. Reddy, B. Vittalacharya and Kodi Ramakrishna have pioneered this genre. 1956 film Tenali Ramakrishna has garnered the All India Certificate of Merit for Best Feature Film. In 2013, IBN Live poll cited Mayabazar as the greatest Indian film of all time.

Relangi and Ramana Reddy were a comedy double act during this era. Nartanasala won three awards at the third Afro-Asian Film Festival in Jakarta. Donga Ramudu directed by K. V. Reddy was archived in the curriculum of the Film and Television Institute of India. Nammina Bantu received critical reception at the San Sebastián International Film Festival. 1967 film Ummadi Kutumbam was selected by Film Federation of India as one of its entries to the Moscow Film Festival. The 1968 cult classic Sudigundalu was screened at the Tashkent and Moscow Film Festivals. Bapu's directorial venture Sakshi was showcased at Tashkent International film festival in 1968. In 1976, he directed Sita Kalyanam got critical acclaim at the BFI London Film Festival and Chicago International Film Festival, and is part of the curriculum at British Film Institute.

Rise of Tollywood 
The nickname Tollywood is a portmanteau of the words Telugu and Hollywood. Moola Narayana Swamy and B. N. Reddy founded Vijaya Vauhini Studios in 1948 in the city of Chennai. Indian film doyen L. V. Prasad, who started his film career with Bhakta Prahlada, founded Prasad Studios in 1956 based in Chennai. However, through the efforts of D. V. S. Raju, the Telugu film industry completely shifted its base from Chennai to Hyderabad in the early 1990s, during N. T. Rama Rao's political reign.

Veteran actor Akkineni Nageswara Rao relocated to Hyderabad and has developed Annapurna Studios. The Telugu film industry is one of the three largest film producers in India. About 245 Telugu films were produced in 2006, the highest in India for that year. Film studios in Hyderabad, developed by D. Ramanaidu and Ramoji Rao, are involved in prolific film production and employment. There is a fair amount of dispersion among the Indian film industries. Since 2005, many successful Telugu films have been largely remade by the Bengali cinema and Hindi film industries, while in the past, Telugu filmmakers drew inspiration from Bengali cinema and literature. Telugu film production accounts for one percent of the gross domestic product of the region.

The digital cinema network company UFO Moviez marketed by Southern Digital Screenz (SDS) has digitized several cinemas in the region. The Film and Television Institute of Telangana, Film and Television Institute of Andhra Pradesh, Ramanaidu Film School and Annapurna International School of Film and Media are some of the largest film schools in India. The Telugu states consist of approximately 2800 theaters, the largest number of cinema halls of any state in India. Being commercially consistent, Telugu cinema had its influence over commercial cinema in India.

The industry holds the Guinness World Record for the largest film production facility in the world, Ramoji Film City. The Prasads IMAX located in Hyderabad is one of the largest 3D IMAX screens, and the most attended cinema screen in the world. As per the CBFC report of 2014, the industry is placed first in India, in terms of films produced yearly. The industry holds a memorandum of understanding with the Motion Picture Association of America to combat video piracy. In the years 2005, 2006, 2008, and 2014 the industry has produced the largest number of films in India, exceeding the number of films produced in Bollywood.

1992 film Gharana Mogudu is the first Telugu film to gross over 10 crore at the box office. Produced on a shoe string budget of 1.2 crore, 2000 film Nuvve Kavali became sleeper hit of the late 1990s. It was screened for 200 days in 20 screens grossing over 20 crore.

Neo Tollywood 

Dasari Narayana Rao directed the most number of films in the Telugu language, exploring themes such as aesthestics in Meghasandesam (1982), Battle of Bobbili in the biographical war film Tandra Paparayudu (1986), alternate history with Sardar Papa Rayudu (1980), and gender discrimination in Kante Koothurne Kanu (1998) for which he received the Special Jury Award (Feature Film - Director) at the 46th National Film Awards. K. Raghavendra Rao explored devotional themes with Agni Putrudu (1987), Annamayya (1997), Sri Manjunatha (2001), Sri Ramadasu (2006), Shirdi Sai (2012) and Om Namo Venkatesaya (2017) receiving various state honours.

Singeetam Srinivasa Rao introduced science fiction to the Telugu screen with Aditya 369 (1991), the film dealt with exploratory dystopian and apocalyptic themes. The edge of the seat thriller had characters which stayed human, inconsistent and insecure. The film's narrative takes the audience into the post apocalyptic experience through time travel, as well as folklore generation of 1500 CE, which including a romantic backstory, the "Time Machine" made it a brilliant work of fiction.

Ram Gopal Varma's Siva, which attained cult status in Telugu cinema, is one of the first Telugu films produced after the migration of Telugu film industry from Madras to Hyderabad to feature characters speaking the Telangana dialect. Varma was credited with the introduction of steadicams and new sound recording techniques in Telugu films. Within a year of the film's release, more than ten steadicams were imported into India. Siva attracted the young audience during its theatrical run, and its success encouraged filmmakers to explore a variety of themes and make experimental Telugu films.

Subsequently, Varma introduced road movie and film-noir to Indian screen with Kshana Kshanam. Varma experimented with close-to-life performances by the lead actors, which bought a rather fictional storyline a sense of authenticity at a time when the industry was being filled with unnecessary commercial fillers. It went on to gather a cult following in south India, with a dubbed Hindi version titled Hairaan released to positive reports from bollywood critics, the Ann Arbor Film Festival, and the Fribourg Festival.

Chiranjeevi's works such as the comedy thriller, Chantabbai, the vigilante thriller, Kondaveeti Donga the first Telugu film to be released on a 70 mm 6-Track Stereophonic sound, the western thriller Kodama Simham, and the action thriller, Gang Leader, popularized genre films with the highest estimated footfall. Reddiff.com cited Sekhar Kammula's, National Award-winning Dollar Dreams (2000) as a take off from where Nagesh Kukunoor's Hyderabad Blues (1998) ends. Dollar Dreams explored the conflict between American dreams and human feelings. The film re-introduced social realism to Telugu screen, and brought back its lost glory which until then was stuck in its run of the mill commercial pot-boilers.

Vanaja (2006) won several international awards including the first prize in the live-action feature film category at the Chicago International Children's Film Festival. Dream (2012), has garnered the Royal Reel Award at the Canada International Film Festival. 2013 Social problem film, Naa Bangaaru Talli won Best Film award at the Detroit Trinity International Film Festival.

Minugurulu (2014) about blind children received Best Indian Film at the "9th India International Children's Film Festival Bangalore". 2013 Cultural film, O Friend, This Waiting! has received special mention at the Erasing Borders Festival of Classical Dance, Indo-American Arts Council, New York, 2013. Experimental film Parampara has garnered the Platinum Award for Best Feature at the International Indonesian Movie Awards. 2018 biographical film Mahanati based on the life of veteran actress Savitri has garnered the "Equality in Cinema Award" at the 2018 Indian Film Festival of Melbourne.

During the 1990s, the Rayalaseema dialect was portrayed in films about the factional conflicts in the area, while the Telangana dialect, already having been pegged to villainous and comedic roles, saw an increase in this usage in reaction to the shift of the Telugu film production from Madras to Hyderabad. After the formation of the state of Telangana in 2014, Telangana culture gained more prominence, and more films were produced portraying Telangana culture, and dialect.

Sub-genres and off beat films 

Screenwriters such as Chandra Sekhar Yeleti experimented with the off beat film Aithe (2003) with a caption "all movies are not the same". Aithe was made on a shoestring budget of about 1.5 crores and went on to collect more than 6 crores. After almost two years he delivered another thriller Anukokunda Oka Roju (2005) both films were a refreshing change of pace to the audiences, produced by Gangaraju Gunnam. Aithe was remade in Tamil as Naam (2003) and in Malayalam as Wanted (2004).

Mohana Krishna Indraganti explored the themes of chastity, and adultery in his literary adaption Grahanam (2004) (based on "Gunadosham" by social critic G. V. Chalam). Grahanam was shot in 19 days with a digital camera. B. Anuradha of Rediff.com cited "In this offbeat film, Indraganti upholds the tirade against chauvinists who accuse a noble lady of infidelity, ignoring her denials with contempt". The film was featured at the Independent South Asian Film Festival in the United States.

Speaking about the centenary of Indian cinema at the CII Media and Entertainment Summit 2012, filmmaker Shekhar Kapur said regional cinema is surpassing Hindi cinema in content and story, and cited Eega (2012) as an example. Kapur said he was impressed with its story and use of technology, and called it "no less than a Hollywood superhero film". Shah Rukh Khan called Eega an "awesomely original" film and a "must watch" with children. Eega won various awards at the 8th Toronto After Dark Film Festival.

Sub Genre war drama Kanche (2015) by Krish Jagarlamudi explored the 1944 Nazi attack on the Indian army in the Italian campaign, during World War II in an engrossing background tale of caste-ism while giving it a technically brilliant cinematic rendition. Sankalp Reddy explored submarine warfare in his directorial debut Ghazi (2017), based on the mysterious altercation between PNS Ghazi and INS Karanj during the Indo-Pakistani War of 1971. Indo-Asian News Service called new-generation film maker Sandeep Vanga's Arjun Reddy the "most original, experimental work to come out of Telugu cinema in a long time", and said the protagonist's (played by Vijay Deverakonda) "rise, fall and rise ... is nothing short of poetic and heart wrenching". Actor-dancer Allu Arjun produced and acted in the short film, I Am That Change (2014), to spread awareness on individual social responsibility. The movie was directed by Sukumar, which was screened in theatres across Andhra Pradesh and Telangana on Indian Independence day, 2014.

Adivi Sesh scripted the Neo-noir Kshanam (2016), based on a real life incident of a missing three-year-old girl. Sesh followed it up writing R.A.W. thriller Goodachari (2018), and the war docudrama Major (2022). Cinema Bandi (2022) scripted and directed by Praveen Kandregula, and produced by film making duo Raj and D. K.; explored the theme of how a lost camera fuels dreams in a Telugu hamlet, winning the Jury Special Mention at the 53rd IFFI.

Spread to World markets 

Athadu was released with 6 prints in United States and was distributed by Vishnu Mudda and Soma Kancherla of Crown DVD distribution company in San Jose, Dallas, Detroit, Virginia, New Jersey, Atlanta, Chicago, Los Angeles, Boston, Minneapolis, Phoenix at Arizona and also in centers like Lowell at Massachusetts, MA, Tulsa at Oklahoma, West Virginia, Springfield, Boulder at Colorado and Corpus Christi at South Texas. Because of the demand, another print was imported from India for screening. The film's first screening in USA happened at Cine Plaza 13 at North Bergen on the night of 11 August 2005. At Connecticut, a special screening was conducted on 19 August 2005. Initially one show was planned but because of the demand another show was screened. There at the theater, a turn out of 442 people was observed which included standing audience for 434 seats and about 60 could not be accommodated. Apart from USA, the film released in selected screens in United Kingdom, Singapore, Germany and Australia.

Bommarillu was released worldwide with 72 prints. Owing to its success, the number of reels grew to about hundred. It collected a distributors share of 5 crore in its opening week in India. Released in six major metros in the United States, the film collected $73,200 (then approximately 0.3 crore) within the first four days of screening. A 2006 survey conducted by a popular entertainment portal in the United States revealed that the film was watched by an Indian expatriate population of 65,000, which generated a revenue of 3 crore at that time. A cumulative gross revenue for the film was reported to be 25 crore including 3.5 crore from overseas, the largest for any Telugu film at that time. Owing to this path breaking trade, the film was remade into Tamil, Bengali, Oriya and Urdu/Hindi.

2006 action film, Pokiri has been remade in Hindi, Tamil and Kannada in the following two years owing to the film's commercial success. It was screened at the IIFA film festival held in Dubai in 2006. Walt Disney Pictures co-produced Anaganaga O Dheerudu, making it the first South Indian production by Disney. Dookudu was released among seventy nine screens in the United States, the Los Angeles Times quoted it as The biggest hit you've never heard of. In the rest of north, east and west India, it opened up in 21 cities. The film set a box office record by collecting a gross of more than 100 crore at the time.

On 1 June 2022, RRR was screened in over 100 theatres across the United States for a one night event called "#encoRRRe". Speaking to Deadline Hollywood, Dylan Marchetti of Variance Films said that "With more than 250 films coming out of India annually, RRR could be a gateway drug". Nashville Scenes Jason Shawhan wrote about the event that "the nationwide encore of RRR is American audiences reaching with outstretched arms to something so exciting and rock-solid entertaining that its success already happened without insular traditional media even mentioning it. This isn't America dipping a toe in Indian cinema — it's a victory lap". Filmmaker S. S. Rajamouli has been signed by American talent agency Creative Artists Agency, owing to RRR being the only non-English-language film to trend globally on Netflix Platform for 10 consecutive weeks.

Cast and crew 

V. Nagayya was one of the most influential method actors of Indian cinema during crown rule. Vemuri Gaggaiah, Kalyanam Raghuramayya, R. Nageswara Rao, C.S.R. Anjaneyulu, Yadavalli Suryanarayana, C. H. Narayana Rao, Mudigonda Lingamurthy etc., are some of the finest method actors during the golden era. S. V. Ranga Rao won Best Actor Award for his portrayal of Kichaka in Nartanasala at the third Afro-Asian Film Festival held in Jakarta.

Adurthi Subba Rao, garnered seven National Film Awards, for his pioneering work on drama films. K. N. T. Sastry and Pattabhirama Reddy have garnered international recognition for their works in neo-realistic cinema. A. Kutumba Rao is known for directing children's films such as Bhadram Koduko, Thodu, and Paatha Nagaramlo Pasivadu the latter winning Cairo International Film Festival's, Merit Certificate for best feature. Jandhyala, and Trivikram Srinivas are known for screwball comedy, and action comedy. A. Sreekar Prasad garnered pan-India recognition for film editing across multiple languages.

Krishna Ghattamaneni is credited with producing many technological firsts such as the first cinemascope film Alluri Seetarama Raju, first 70mm film Simhasanam, first DTS film Telugu Veera Levara (1988) and introducing cowboy and bond movie styles to the Telugu screen. Sharada, Archana, Vijayashanti, Rohini, Keerthy Suresh, P. L. Narayana, and Nagarjuna received the National Film Award for acting. Chiranjeevi, was listed among "The men who changed the face of the Indian Cinema" by IBN-live India. Brahmanandam, holds a Guinness World Record for acting in the most films in the same language. Vijayachander acted and produced hagiographical films, he esaayed "Jesus of Nazareth" in Karunamayudu (1978), "Sai Baba of Shirdi" in Sri Shirdi Saibaba Mahathyam (1986), "Vemana" in Vemana Charithra (1986), and "Saint Paul" in Dayamayudu (1987). 
Mohan Babu is starred in more than 500 feature films in a variety of antagonist roles.

Cinematography and visual effects 

V. N. Reddy, K. S. Prasad, Jaya Gummadi, Sudhakar Yakkanti, and C. Rajendra Prasad garnered pan India recognition for their cinematographic works. Enhanced technology among live action animation, digital compositing, and special effects paved the way for upgrading from established cinematic norms. Visual effects based high fantasy works have tasted success. Pete Draper, P. C. Sanath, Chakri Toleti and V. Srinivas Mohan supervise visual effects.

Film critics and jury members 
Vasiraju Prakasam and K. N. T. Sastry are one of the noted Indian film critics from the region. B. S. Narayana was a member of the Indian delegation to the Tashkent Film Festival in 1974, and the Moscow International Film Festival in 1975. Gummadi, served as official member of the Indian delegation from South India to the Tashkent Film Festival in 1978 and 1982. He served as the Jury Member thrice for the 28th, 33rd, and 39th National Film Awards. Chandra Siddhartha served in South Jury at the 57th, 61st and 65th National Film Awards, as well as the 49th IFFI.

Film Score 
Sri Sri was one of the influential film lyricists of his time, who garnered national honors such as Sahitya Akademi Award, Best Lyricist and Soviet Land Nehru Award for his pioneering work.
Susarla Dakshinamurthi, Parupalli Ramakrishnaiah Pantulu, Ogirala Ramachandra Rao,
Pithapuram Nageswara Rao, Tanguturi Suryakumari, and Mangalampalli Balamuralikrishna are some of the influential music composers of Southern Indian cinema. Music composers such as Pendyala Nageswara Rao, R. Sudarshanam and R. Goverdhanam made contributions to folklore and mythological films.

Madhavapeddi Satyam, P. Adinarayana Rao, Gali Penchala Narasimha Rao, Chellapilla Satyam, P. B. Sreenivas, S. P. Kodandapani, G. K. Venkatesh, S. Hanumantha Rao, have contributed their work extensively for films containing themes of social relevance. S.P. Balasubrahmanyam is a multilingual playback singer from Telugu cinema to win National Film Awards across four languages. He holds the record of having recorded more songs than any other male playback singer and has received 25 state Nandi Awards.

S. Rajeswara Rao pioneered the use of light music in Telugu cinema; Rao's most rewarding assignments came from Gemini Studios, which he joined in 1940 and with which he remained for a decade. Ghantasala, performed in the United States, England, and Germany. According to The Hindu, and The Indian Express he was "Such a divine talent and with his songs he could move the hearts of the people. Ghantasala's blending of classical improvisations to the art of light music combined with his virtuosity and sensitivity puts him a class apart, above all others in the field of playback singing".

P. Susheela, has been recognized by both the Guinness Book of World Records and the Asia Book of Records for singing most songs in Indian languages. She is also the recipient of five National Film Award for Best Female Playback Singer and numerous state awards. Works by S. Janaki, Ramesh Naidu, and M. M. Keeravani, have received global recognition, the later fetching the Academy Award for Best Original Song, and the Golden Globe Award for Best Original Song in 2023 for "Naatu Naatu" from RRR. K. S. Chitra has received highest Nandi awards for best female playback singer. Multi-instrumentalists duo Raj–Koti holds a notable career spanning a decade, the duo has garnered particular acclaim for redefining contemporary music. R. P. Patnaik is the current president of the Telugu Cine Music Association.

Guinness records 
 Guinness Record had been awarded to Ramoji Film City, Hyderabad as the largest film studio complex in the world, it opened in 1996 and measures 674 hectares (1,666 acres). With 47 sound stages, it has permanent sets ranging from railway stations to temples.
 D. Rama Naidu holds the Guinness World Record as the most prolific producer with 130 films.
 Dasari Narayana Rao holds the Guinness World Record as the most films directed with 151 films.
 Brahmanandam holds the Guinness World Record for acting in the most films in a single language, 1000+ films.
 S. P. Balasubrahmanyam holds the Guinness World Record for having sung the most songs for any male playback singer in the world, with the majority of his songs sung in Telugu.
 Vijaya Nirmala holds a Guinness World Record as the female director with the most films, having made 47 films.
 In 2016, P. Susheela entered the Guinness Book of World Records for recording the highest number of songs in musical history.

Dubbed films 
The 1949 film Keelu Gurram was the first Telugu film to be dubbed into the Tamil language, being subsequently released under the name Maya Kudhirai. According to the Andhra Pradesh Film Chamber of Commerce, "as per the Judgement of Supreme Court in Ashirwad Films in W.P.(Civil) No.709 there will be no difference in taxation of films between the dubbed films coming in from other states and the films produced in the Telugu States". Aarya movie was later dubbed to Malayalam.

Distribution 
The Telugu-speaking areas are broadly divided into three areas for the purposes of Film Distribution, namely, Nizam, Ceded and Andhra. Nizam alone contributes to nearly 45% of the revenue.

Telugu film distribution territories 

Apart from the above, there is also an emerging Overseas territory, especially United States which accounts for a significant amount of revenue.

Awards 
National Film Awards

Dadasaheb Phalke Award

State Awards
The Nandi Awards is the most prominent Government funded award ceremony for excellence in the production of Telugu film, theatre and television. It was instituted in 1964 by the Film, Television and Theatre Development Corporation of the erstwhile combined Government of Andhra Pradesh, presented annually at Lalitha Kala Thoranam in Hyderabad. "Nandi" means "bull", the awards being named after the big granite bull at Lepakshi — a cultural and historical symbol of the Telugu culture.

Nandi Honorary Awards
 Raghupathi Venkaiah Award
 NTR National Award
 B. N. Reddy National Award
 Nagi Reddy Chakrapani National Award

South Film Awards
 Filmfare Awards South
 IIFA Utsavam
 South Indian International Movie Awards

Regional Awards
 Sangam Academy Award
 Chittoor Nagayya Puraskaram
 CineMAA Awards
 Allu Ramalingaiah Award
 Gollapudi Srinivas Award
 Tollywood GAAMA Awards
 Gemini Ugadi Puraskaralu
 Hyderabad Times Film Awards
 Vamsee Berkely Awards
 Akruti Film Awards
 FNCC Awards
 Andhra Pradesh Film Journalist's Association Awards
 Santosham Film Awards
 T. Subbarami Reddy Award
 ANR National Award
 Sakshi Excellence Awards

Studios 
Major Filmmaking studios
 Ramanaidu Studios
 Saradhi Studios
 Ramakrishna Studios
 Padmalaya Studios
 Annapurna Studios
 Ramoji Film City
Visual effects and animation studios
 Prasad EFX – Magic in motion
 Pixelloid Studios
 Fire Fly Creative Studios
 Makuta VFX

See also 
 List of Indian winners and nominees of the Academy Awards
 List of Indian winners and nominees of the Golden Globe Awards
 List of highest-grossing Indian films
 List of South Indian film families
 List of silent films from South India

Notes

References

Bibliography

Further reading

External links 
 

Telugu cinema
Telugu film families
Economy of Andhra Pradesh
Economy of Telangana
Culture of Andhra Pradesh
Culture of Telangana
Telugu language
Film production districts